The Battle of Ephesus may refer to:

 Battle of Ephesus (498 BC), in the Ionian Revolt
 Battle of Ephesus (406 BC), between Athenians and Peloponnesians
 Battle of Ephesus (ca. 258 BC), between the Rhodian and Ptolemaic fleets
 Battle of Ephesus (1147), during the Second Crusade